The 1932 Staten Island Stapletons season was their fourth and final in the league. The team failed to improve on their previous output of 4–6–1, winning only two games. They failed to qualify for the playoffs.

Schedule

Standings

References

Staten Island Stapletons seasons
Staten Island Stapletons